Pirosmani may refer to:

Niko Pirosmani (1862–1918), Georgian painter
Pirosmani (film), a 1969 Soviet biographical film about the painter
Pirosmani, an administrative unit of Dedoplistsqaro Municipality, Georgia